Bang snaps are a type of small novelty firework sold as a trick noisemaker.

Composition
Bang snaps consist of a small amount of gravel or coarse sand impregnated with a minute quantity (~0.2 milligrams) of silver fulminate high explosive and twisted in a cigarette paper to produce a shape resembling a cherry. The friction-sensitive silver fulminate detonates when stepped on, ignited, or thrown on a hard surface, producing a sharp salute similar to a cap gun's.

Despite producing a legitimate (albeit tiny) high-explosive detonation, the extremely high mass ratio of gravel to explosive acts as a buffer to ensure that they only produce the audible "crack" of the supersonic shockwave; they are incapable  of producing physical damage, even when discharged in the hand. The explosion is unable to propel the gravel any distance, which usually falls to the ground, making them safe for use as a children's toy, for which purpose they have been widely sold around the world since the 1950s. They are also a common part of Chinese New Year celebrations.

Production
Bang snaps are primarily produced alongside other export fireworks in Brazil, Korea and China and are widely available over the counter at small toy stores and shops specializing in jokes, novelties and magic tricks. The snaps are typically packed in sawdust to prevent them from discharging due to rough handling while in transit.

Some US states and counties impose the same age restrictions on purchasing bang snaps as that of permitted fireworks, usually 17 or 18.

In the UK they are advertised as fun snaps, and sold only to people 16 or above.

In popular culture

 In the 1985 film The Goonies, Data uses bang snaps as "booby traps" against the Fratelli family on their trail.
 In Jackie Chan's film Police Story 2, bang snaps were thrown against Police Inspector Chan Ka-kui (played by Jackie Chan).
 American musician Rickie Lee Jones used the box artwork from the "Pop Pop"-brand of bang snaps (made by Garrywa Fireworks of China) for the cover of her 1991 album of the same name.
 In the 1999 comedy Big Daddy, Julian bonds with his biological father, Kevin, by throwing bang snaps (even at Kevin's feet).
 In the South Park episode "Good Times with Weapons", Cartman annoys Kyle by constantly throwing bang snaps at his feet.
 In the pilot of American Horror Story, a pair of twins use bang snaps to scare others.
 In Yandere Simulator, the player can order a box of bang snaps from Info-chan and use them to create distractions, and the player can even craft bang snaps in the workshop room at the school.

See also
Salute (pyrotechnics)
Silver fulminate
Firecracker
Cap pistol

References

External links 

Types of fireworks
Pyrotechnics